Ekonomist is a Montenegrin online magazine, founded in 2014 in Podgorica. Ekonomist'''s primary focus is Montenegrin and world events, finances, business and economy. It aims at promoting good business practice and developing entrepreneurial awareness, as an important aspect of economic growth. Ekonomist'' is also the only FinTech portal in Montenegro, thus representing a platform for business and technology themes. In addition to national and world news, it features interviews, opinions, and career advice. Editor in chief is Ljiljana Premović.

Sources

External links
Official website

Business magazines
Magazines established in 2014
Mass media in Podgorica
Magazines published in Montenegro
Online magazines